The Selden Roll is a 16th century Mexican manuscript painted roll from the Coixtlahuaca region, incorporating both Mixtec and Aztec elements, probably recording myths of the origin and migration of divine ancestors.

The Selden Roll belonged to the English jurist John Selden, who died in 1654 and left his collection of books and manuscripts to the University of Oxford. It is held at the Bodleian Library (shelfmark MS. Arch. Selden. A. 72 (3)).

The roll was shown in a small public exhibition at the Bodleian Library in 2015 entitled "The Roll of the New Fire (Selden Roll): Painting from Early Colonial Mexico".

The Bodleian Library holds four other Mesoamerican codices: Codex Bodley, Codex Laud, Codex Mendoza, and Codex Selden.

Gallery

Further reading
Boone, Elizabeth Hill. Stories in Red and Black: Pictorial Histories of the Aztecs and Mixtecs. Austin: University of Texas Press 2000.
Boone, Elizabeth Hill. "Selden Roll," in Oxford Encyclopedia of Mesoamerican Cultures, David Carrasco, ed. New York: Oxford University Press 2001, pp. 133–34.
Burland, Cottie. The Selden Roll: An Ancient Mexican Picture Manuscript in the Bodelan Library at Oxford. Berlin 1955.

References

External links
 MS. Arch. Selden. A. 72 (3) in the Catalogue of Medieval Manuscripts in Oxford Libraries
 MS. Arch. Selden. A. 72 (3) partial facsimile available in Digital Bodleian

Aztec codices
Mixtec codices
Bodleian Library collection